Chara or Chará is a feminine given name and a surname (Chara). Chara is an English feminine given name that is a diminutive form of Charlotte as well as an alternate form of Cara and Kara from the Latin cārus meaning “darling, beloved, dear, loved one”. Chara is also a Spanish feminine given name as an alternate form for Sarah. Chará (Greek: Χαρά) is a Greek feminine given name from the Ancient Greek word khará which means joy, gladness. It is a short form of the feminine name Charalampía which is a combination of the Ancient Greek roots khará (joy, gladness) and lámpō (shine). It is also a short form of the feminine name Chariclea who was one of the Forty Holy Virgin Martyrs who were tortured because they would not offer sacrifice to idols and kept their Christian Faith. Chariclea is a combination of the Ancient Greek roots charis (grace) and kleos (glory).  Notable people who are known by this name include the following:

Mononym
Chara (singer), stagename of Miwa Watabiki (born 1968), Japanese singer, actress and video jockey
Chara (footballer), nickname of Fernando Agostinho da Costa (born 1981), Angolan football player

Given name
Chara Bachir, Algerian politician
Chara Charalambous (born 2000), Cypriot footballer
Chara M. Curtis, American writer 
Chara Dimitriou (born 1990), Greek football player
Chara Papadopoulou (born 1996), Greek volleyball player

See also

Cara (given name)
Chapa (given name)
Chapa (surname)
Char (name)
Chard (name)
Chari (surname)
Charl (name)
Charla (name)
Charo (name)
Chiara (name)
Ciara (given name)
Clara (given name)
Chmara

Notes

English feminine given names
Greek feminine given names
Spanish feminine given names